Temple of Asclepius may refer to:
Temple of Asclepius, Epidaurus
Temple of Asclepius, Rome
Temple of Aesculapius (Villa Borghese)
Asclepeion

See also 
 Asclepius (disambiguation)